Sri Venkateswara Swami vari Brahmotsavam or Srivari Brahmotsavam is the most significant annual fête celebrated at the Venkateswara Temple in Tirumala-Tirupati, Tirupati district, Andhra Pradesh, India. The feast lasts for one month during the Hindu calendar month of Āśvina, which falls between the Gregorian calendar months of September and October.

The Utsava-murti (processional deity) of the presiding deity, Venkateswara, and his consorts Sridevi and Bhudevi are taken on a procession on several vahanams on the streets surrounding the temple. The celebration attracts pilgrims and tourists from all over India and around the world. A Brahmotsavam is a cleansing ceremony in honor of Lord Brahma, and the ceremony at Tirumala is the largest.

Etymology
The word Brahmotsavam is a combination of two Sanskrit words—Brahma and utsavam (festival)—and Brahma reportedly conducted the first festival. Brahma also means "grand" or "large". Srivari Brahmotsavam is also known as "Venkateswara Salakatla Brahmotsavams" and "Venkateswara Navaratri Brahmotsavams".

Two festivals
When there is an extra month in the lunar calendar, two Brahmotsavam are held viz., Salakatla and Navarathri. Both festivals were held in 2015. 2018 and 2020.

In Salakatla Brahmotsavam, Rathotsavam (Big Chariot) is held on the morning of the eighth day; during Navratri Brahmotsavam, Golden Chariot (Swarna Rathotsavam) is held that morning of the eighth day. In Salakatla Brahmotsavam, there will be flag hoisting (Dwajarohanam) on 1st day and flag-lowering (Dwajaavarohanam) on the evening of the ninth day.

History and legend
According to the legend of Tirumala, Brahma descends to earth to conduct the festival. Sri Venkteswara Sahasranamastotra refers to Brahma performing the festival, signified by a small, empty wooden chariot (brahmaratham) which moves ahead of the processions of the Venkateswara processional deity Malayappa.

The first reference to festivals in the Tirumala Venkateswara Temple was in 966 CE, when the Pallava queen Samavai endowed land and ordered its revenue to celebrate festivals in the temple. Until 1582, Brahmotsavams were held as often as 12 times a year.

Celebrations
The Brahmotsavam is held over nine days at the beginning of the Hindu calendar month of Āśvina, paralleling Navaratri. The evening before the first day, the rite of Ankurarpana (the sowing of seeds to signify fertility and abundance) is performed. The main first-day activity is Dwajarohana, the raising of the Garuda flag to signify the beginning of the festival. Religious activities during the festival include daily homas and processions on streets surrounding the temple. The final day commemorates Venkateswara's birth star. The Sudarshana Chakra is bathed in the temple tank with the devotees. The Chakra is then placed on a high platform, and the devotees walk under it and are blessed with its dripping water. The festival ends with Dhvajavarohanam, the lowering of the Garuda flag.

Procedure
First day

Second day

Third day
Forth day

Fifth day
Sixth day

Seventh day
Eighth day
Ninth day

See also
 Venkateswara
 Tirumala Tirupati Devasthanams

References

Sources

External links
The Hindu reports on Brahmotsavam
The temple's official page on the festival

Festivals in Andhra Pradesh
Hindu festivals
Religious festivals in India
September events
October events
Tirumala festivals
Tirumala Tirupati Devasthanams
Tirumala Venkateswara Temple
Tirupati